Twelve national teams competed in the women's Olympic hockey tournament at the 2012 Summer Olympics in London. Sixteen players were officially enrolled in each squad. Two reserve players could also be nominated to be available should a player enrolled in the official squad become injured during the tournament.

Pool A

Netherlands
The following is the Netherlands roster in the women's field hockey tournament of the 2012 Summer Olympics.

Head Coach: Maximiliano Caldas

Joyce Sombroek (GK)
Kitty van Male
Willemijn Bos^
Carlien Dirkse van den Heuvel
Kelly Jonker
Maartje Goderie
Lidewij Welten
Caia van Maasakker
Maartje Paumen (C)
Naomi van As
Ellen Hoog
Sophie Polkamp
Kim Lammers
Eva de Goede
Marilyn Agliotti
Merel de Blaeij
Margot van Geffen

Reserves:
 Floortje Engels (GK)
 Marieke Veenhoven-Mattheussens

^ Willemijn Bos injured her cruciate ligament during a friendly match.

Great Britain
The Great Britain women's field hockey team for the 2012 Games was announced on 18 May 2012.

Head Coach: Danny Kerry

Beth Storry (GK)
Emily Maguire
Laura Unsworth
Crista Cullen
Hannah Macleod
Anne Panter
Helen Richardson
Kate Walsh (C)
Chloe Rogers
Laura Bartlett
Alex Danson
Georgie Twigg
Ashleigh Ball
Sally Walton
Nicola White
Sarah Thomas

Reserves:
 Natalie Seymour
 Abi Walker

China
The following is the Chinese roster in the women's field hockey tournament of the 2012 Summer Olympics.

Ma Yibo
Wang Mengyu
Ma Wei
Sun Sinan
Cui Qiuxia
<li value=8>Fu Baorong
<li value=10>Gao Lihua
<li value=16>Zhang Yimeng (GK)
<li value=17>Li Hongxia
<li value=18>Ren Ye (C)
<li value=21>Zhao Yudiao
<li value=22>Song Qingling
<li value=23>De Jiaojiao
<li value=25>Xu Xiaoxu
<li value=28>Liang Meiyu
<li value=29>Peng Yang

Reserves:
 Li Dongxiao (GK)
 Tang Chunling

South Korea
The following is the South Korea roster in the women's field hockey tournament of the 2012 Summer Olympics.

Head Coach: Lim Heung-sin

<li value=1>Moon Young-hui (GK)
<li value=4>Kim Young-ran
<li value=5>Cha Se-na
<li value=6>Park Seon-mi
<li value=7>Lee Seon-ok (C)
<li value=8>Park Mi-hyun
<li value=9>Han Hye-lyoung
<li value=10>Kim Jong-hee
<li value=11>Kim Jong-eun
<li value=12>Kim Da-rae
<li value=13>Cheon Seul-ki
<li value=14>Jeon Yu-mi
<li value=17>Kim Ok-ju
<li value=21>Park Ki-ju
<li value=22>Jang Soo-ji (GK)
<li value=23>Cheon Eun-bi

Reserves:
 Cho Eun-ji
 Hong Yoo-jin

Japan
The following is the Japan roster in the women's field hockey tournament of the 2012 Summer Olympics.

Head Coach: Zenjiro Yasuda

<li value=1>Sakiyo Asano (GK)
<li value=2>Nagisa Hayashi
<li value=3>Akemi Kato
<li value=4>Sachimi Iwao
<li value=5>Miyuki Nakagawa
<li value=6>Ai Murakami
<li value=7>Shiho Otsuka
<li value=8>Yukari Yamamoto (C)
<li value=9>Aki Mitsuhashi
<li value=10>Rika Komazawa
<li value=11>Kaori Fujio
<li value=12>Akane Shibata
<li value=13>Chie Akutsu
<li value=14>Keiko Manabe
<li value=17>Masako Sato
<li value=21>Izuki Tanaka

Reserves:
 Mika Imura
 Ryoko Oie (GK)

Belgium
The following is the Belgium roster in the men's field hockey tournament of the 2012 Summer Olympics.

Head Coach: Pascal Kina

<li value=3>Louise Cavenaile
<li value=5>Stephanie de Groof
<li value=6>Anouk Raes
<li value=7>Judith Vandermeiren
<li value=9>Lieselotte van Lindt
<li value=10>Lola Danhaive
<li value=11>Erica Coppey
<li value=12>Gaëlle Valcke
<li value=13>Alix Gerniers
<li value=14>Emilie Sinia
<li value=15>Charlotte de Vos (C)
<li value=17>Anne-Sophie van Regemortel
<li value=19>Barbara Nelen
<li value=21>Aisling D'Hooghe (GK)
<li value=22>Hélène Delmée
<li value=27>Jill Boon

Reserves:
 Nadine Khouzam (GK)
 Valerie Vermeersch

Pool B

Argentina
The following is the Argentina roster in the women's field hockey tournament of the 2012 Summer Olympics.

Head Coach: Carlos Retegui

<li value=1>Laura del Colle (GK)
<li value=4>Rosario Luchetti
<li value=5>Macarena Rodríguez
<li value=7>Martina Cavallero
<li value=8>Luciana Aymar (C)
<li value=11>Carla Rebecchi
<li value=12>Delfina Merino
<li value=16>Florencia Habif
<li value=17>Rocío Sánchez Moccia
<li value=18>Daniela Sruoga
<li value=19>Sofía Maccari
<li value=21>Mariela Scarone
<li value=25>Silvina D'Elía
<li value=27>Noel Barrionuevo
<li value=30>Josefina Sruoga
<li value=31>Florencia Mutio (GK)

Reserves:
 Julieta Franco
 Carla Dupuy

Germany
The following is the Germany roster in the women's field hockey tournament of the 2012 Summer Olympics.

Head Coach: Michael Behrmann

<li value=1>Yvonne Frank (GK)
<li value=4>Mandy Haase
<li value=7>Natascha Keller
<li value=8>Christina Schütze
<li value=9>Kristina Hillmann
<li value=10>Nina Hasselmann
<li value=13>Katharina Otte
<li value=16>Fanny Rinne (C)
<li value=18>Lisa Hahn
<li value=19>Jennifer Plass
<li value=23>Marie Mavers
<li value=24>Maike Stöckel
<li value=25>Janne Müller-Wieland
<li value=26>Celine Wilde
<li value=27>Anke Brockmann
<li value=28>Julia Müller

Reserves:
 Kristina Reynolds (GK)
 Jana Teschke

New Zealand
The following is the New Zealand roster in the women's field hockey tournament of the 2012 Summer Olympics.

Head Coach: Mark Hager

<li value=1>Kayla Sharland
<li value=2>Emily Naylor (C)
<li value=3>Krystal Forgesson
<li value=5>Katie Glynn
<li value=9>Alana Millington
<li value=12>Ella Gunson
<li value=13>Samantha Charlton
<li value=16>Clarissa Eshuis
<li value=20>Samantha Harrison
<li value=21>Cathryn Finlayson
<li value=22>Gemma Flynn
<li value=28>Charlotte Harrison
<li value=29>Melody Cooper
<li value=30>Bianca Russell (GK)
<li value=31>Stacey Michelsen
<li value=32>Anita Punt

Reserves:
 Julia King
 Sally Rutherford (GK)

Australia
The following is the Australian roster in the women's field hockey tournament of the 2012 Summer Olympics.

Head Coach: Adam Commens

<li value=1>Toni Cronk (GK)
<li value=2>Georgia Nanscawen
<li value=4>Casey Eastham
<li value=6>Megan Rivers
<li value=7>Jodie Schulz
<li value=8>Ashleigh Nelson
<li value=9>Anna Flanagan
<li value=12>Madonna Blyth (C)
<li value=15>Kobie McGurk
<li value=21>Jayde Taylor
<li value=22>Kate Jenner
<li value=24>Fiona Boyce
<li value=26>Emily Smith
<li value=28>Hope Munro
<li value=29>Teneal Attard
<li value=31>Jade Close

Reserves:
 Emily Hurtz
 Ashlee Wells (GK)

United States

The following is the American roster in the women's field hockey tournament of the 2012 Summer Olympics.|access-date=}}}}

Head Coach: Lee Bodimeade

<li value=5>Melissa González
<li value=8>Rachel Dawson
<li value=9>Michelle Vittese
<li value=11>Shannon Taylor
<li value=12>Julia Reinprecht
<li value=13>Keli Smith Puzo
<li value=14>Katie Reinprecht
<li value=16>Katie O'Donnell
<li value=18>Michelle Kasold
<li value=19>Caroline Nichols
<li value=20>Paige Selenski
<li value=21>Claire Laubach
<li value=23>Katelyn Falgowski
<li value=25>Amy Swensen (GK)
<li value=26>Kayla Bashore Smedley
<li value=27>Lauren Crandall

Reserves:
 Michelle Cesan
 Jaclyn Kintzer (GK)

South Africa
The following is the South Africa roster in the women's field hockey tournament of the 2012 Summer Olympics.

Head Coach: Giles Bonnet

[[Mariette Rix]] (GK)
<li value=3>[[Kate Woods (field hockey)|Kate Woods]]
<li value=7>[[Illse Davids]]
<li value=8>[[Marsha Marescia]] (C)
<li value=10>[[Shelley Russell]]
<li value=12>[[Dirkie Chamberlain]]
<li value=13>[[Lisa-Marie Deetlefs]]
<li value=15>[[Pietie Coetzee]]
<li value=16>[[Jennifer Wilson (field hockey)|Jennifer Wilson]]
<li value=17>[[Lesle-Ann George]]
<li value=20>[[Nicolene Terblanche]]
<li value=21>[[Lenise Marais]]
<li value=22>[[Kathleen Taylor (field hockey)|Kathleen Taylor]]
<li value=23>[[Bernadette Coston]]
<li value=29>[[Tarryn Bright]]
<li value=30>[[Sulette Damons]]
{{div col end}}
Reserves:
 [[Vuyisanani Mangisa]] (GK)
 [[Lauren Penny]] <section end=RSA />

References
{{Reflist}}

{{Field hockey at the Summer Olympics}}

[[Category:Field hockey players at the 2012 Summer Olympics| ]]
[[Category:Field hockey at the 2012 Summer Olympics – Women's tournament|Squads]]
[[Category:Women's Olympic field hockey squads|2012]]